Arsenate-mycothiol transferase (ArsC1, ArsC2, mycothiol:arsenate transferase) is an enzyme with systematic name mycothiol:arsenate S-arsenotransferase. This enzyme catalyses the following chemical reaction

mycothiol + arsenate  arseno-mycothiol + H2O

Reduction of arsenate is part of a defence mechanism of the cell against toxic arsenate.

References

External links 

EC 2.8.4